EGF may refer to:

 E.G.F., a Gabonese company
 East Grand Forks, Minnesota, a city
 East Garforth railway station in England
 Epidermal growth factor
 Equity Group Foundation, a Kenyan charity
 European Gendarmerie Force, a military unit of the European Union
 European Genetics Foundation, a training organization
 European Globalisation Adjustment Fund
 European Go Federation
 Exponential generating function
 Xinxiang East railway station, China Railway telegraph code EGF